During the 1962–63 English football season, Brentford competed in the Football League Fourth Division for the first time in the club's history. 67 goals from former international forwards John Dick, Billy McAdams and Johnny Brooks helped fire the Bees to the division title and an immediate return to the Third Division.

Season summary 

After suffering relegation for the Fourth Division at the end of the 1961–62 season, Brentford was at one of the lowest points in its history. The relegation completed a 15-year fall from the First Division to the bottom tier and the average attendance at Griffin Park had fallen by 18,000 in that time. Chairman Jack Dunnett pledged that he and his directors would invest money in the first team squad, which had been ravaged by a mass clearout over the previous year (in a bid to cut costs amidst the abolition of the maximum wage). Club legend George Francis was sold to Gillingham for a £4,000 fee, ending a six-year Brentford career in which he scored 136 goals in 280 matches. Funds were made available to manager Malky MacDonald and he spent £5,000 on Norwich City wing half Matt Crowe and £10,000 on Leeds United's former Northern Ireland centre forward Billy McAdams. Tommy Cavanagh was appointed as trainer to replace the departed Fred Monk.

Three wins and four defeats from the opening seven matches led to the chequebook opening again, with the £17,500 purchase of West Ham United's experienced inside left John Dick breaking Brentford's incoming transfer record. The transfer meant the Fourth Division Bees could field a forward line of former international players – Dick (Scotland), McAdams (Northern Ireland) and Brooks (England). The team showed excellent form between September 1962 and the end of the year, rising from mid-table to 2nd place. John Dick had as yet failed to live up to his status, but Billy McAdams ended the year on 15 goals and Johnny Brooks on 12.

The football calendar was frozen out between late December 1962 and February 1963, but when league play got back underway, Brentford solidified their position in the promotion places. Another £18,500 was spent on new signings John Fielding and Mel Scott in March. John Dick came into form in mid-March and supported by McAdams and Brooks, his 15 goals in the final 17 matches helped fire Brentford to the Fourth Division title. The title win made Brentford the first club to win each of the Second, Third and Fourth Division championships.

Three records were set or equalled during the season:
 Most points in a league season: 62 (two points for a win)
 Most league goals scored in a season: 98
 Most consecutive league appearances: 168 – Gerry Cakebread (1 November 1958 – 18 August 1963)

League table

Results
Brentford's goal tally listed first.

Legend

Football League Fourth Division

FA Cup

Football League Cup 

 Sources: 100 Years Of Brentford, Statto

Playing squad 
Players' ages are as of the opening day of the 1962–63 season.

 Sources: 100 Years Of Brentford, Timeless Bees

Coaching staff

Statistics

Appearances and goals

Players listed in italics left the club mid-season.
Source: 100 Years Of Brentford

Goalscorers 

Players listed in italics left the club mid-season.
Source: 100 Years Of Brentford

Management

Summary

Transfers & loans

References 

Brentford F.C. seasons
Brentford